Lom is a town in Most District in the Ústí nad Labem Region of the Czech Republic. It has about 3,700 inhabitants.

Administrative parts
The village of Loučná is an administrative part of Lom.

Geography
The southern part of the municipal territory with the built-up area lies in the Most Basin, the northern part lies in the Ore Mountains.

History
The settlement of Lom was established on the road through the Ore Mountains at the end of the 12th century. 
Until the 17th century, it was focused on agriculture, since then its history is closely connected with mining of iron ore and lignite.

In 1902, Lom became a market town, and in 1938, it became a town. Until 1989, the town was threatened with liquidation due to coal mining. The town gained a new perspective of survival and further development after 1989 with the decision to create a so-called protective pillar on the town's border, to limit and finally to stop further coal mining in this locality.

Sights

The list of Lom's sights include the Church of the Sacred Heart from the 17th century, a plague column with a pedestal and a relief of St. George from the 15th century, the Chapel of the Holy Trinity from the 1980s, the original mining colony from the end of the 19th century, and a conciliation cross with a crossbow relief from the 13th century.

References

External links

Cities and towns in the Czech Republic
Populated places in Most District
Towns in the Ore Mountains